William James (1842–1910) was an American psychologist and philosopher.

William James may also refer to:

Military
 William James (Royal Navy admiral) (1881–1974), British admiral
 William C. James (1896–1974), U.S. Marine Corps general
 William James (Australian general) (1930–2015), Australian Army general
 William K. James (born 1935), U.S. Air Force Major General

Politics
 Sir William James, 1st Baronet (1721–1783), East India Company navy commander and director, Member of Parliament for West Looe 1774–1783
 William James (Carlisle MP) (1791–1861), Member of Parliament for Carlisle 1820–1826
 William H. James (1831–1920), second governor of Nebraska
 W. Frank James (1873–1945), U.S. Representative from Michigan
 William S. James (1914–1993), State Treasurer of Maryland
 William James (MP for Kent), Member of Parliament for Kent, 1654–59

Sports
 William James (cricketer) (1858–?), English cricketer
 William James (rugby league), rugby league footballer in the 1920s and 1930s
 William James (bowls) (born 1969), Swaziland lawn bowler
 William James (American football) (born 1979), American footballer
 Knucks James (William James, 1878–1966), American baseball player

Other
 William James (bishop) (1542–1617), English academic and bishop of Durham, 1606–17
 William James (slave trader) (1735–1798), operating out of the Port of Liverpool
 William James (railway promoter) (1771–1837), British
 William James (naval historian) (1780–1827), British naval historian during the Age of Sail
 William Milbourne James (judge) (1807–1881), British judge
 William James (engineer) (1854–1889), British engineer
 William Dodge James (1854–1912), big game hunter
 William James (photographer) (1866–1948), British-Canadian photographer
 William P. James (1870–1940), U.S. federal judge
 William G. James (1892–1977), Australian pianist
 William "Froggie" James (died 1909), African-American man lynched in Cairo, Illinois

See also
Willy F. James Jr. (1920–1945), Medal of Honor recipient
Bill James (disambiguation)
Billy James (disambiguation)
Will James (disambiguation)
James Williams (disambiguation)